Harriet "Hattie" Coons Babbitt (born November 13, 1947) is an attorney and former U.S. government official, who served as United States Ambassador to the Organization of American States from 1993 to 1997, and as Deputy Administrator of the United States Agency for International Development from 1997 to 2001 during the Clinton Administration. In addition to her government service, she has also practiced as an attorney in both Arizona and Washington, D.C, most recently working at the law office of Jennings Strouss since July, 2006. She is also Vice Chair of the National Democratic Institute for International Affairs, and previously served on the organization's Board of Directors from 1988 to 1993.

Harriet Coons was born in Charleston, West Virginia, and subsequently moved to Brownsville, Texas where she graduated from Brownsville High School in 1965. She graduated from Arizona State University with a B.A. in Spanish in 1969, and a J.D. in 1972. Following graduation from law school she clerked for Arizona Supreme Court Justice Jack D. H. Hays.

While a student at ASU in 1968, she married Bruce Babbitt, who served as Governor of Arizona from 1978 to 1987, and as United States Secretary of the Interior in the Cabinet of President Bill Clinton from 1993 to 2001. They have two sons, Christopher and T.J.

A train line temporarily serving the Phoenix metropolitan area was named for her. After a series of floods in February 1980 damaged many bridges crossing the Salt River, traffic was in a state of gridlock. In response, a temporary commuter train line was started between the cities of Phoenix, Tempe, and Mesa. It used existing freight track and Amtrak trains, operating for about two weeks. The train line was named the "Hattie B." in honor of the governor and first lady's involvement. The line was cancelled as soon as bridges were restored, but it was credited with creating more interest in public transit for the Phoenix area.

References

External links

Babbitt, Harriet C.
Babbitt, Harriet C.
Babbitt, Harriet C.
Babbitt, Harriet C.
Babbitt, Harriet C.
Babbitt, Harriet C.
Babbitt, Harriet C.
Babbitt, Harriet C.
Babbitt, Harriet C.
Babbitt, Harriet C.
Babbitt, Harriet C.
Babbitt, Harriet C.
Babbitt, Harriet C.
Babbitt, Harriet C.
Babbitt, Harriet C
Babbitt, Harriet C.
American women lawyers
American lawyers
Sandra Day O'Connor College of Law alumni
21st-century American women